Baron Wharton is a title in the Peerage of England, originally granted by letters patent to the heirs male of the 1st Baron, which was forfeited in 1729 when the last male-line heir was declared an outlaw. The Barony was erroneously revived in 1916 by writ of summons, thanks to an 1844 decision in the House of Lords based on absence of documentation. As such, the current Barony of Wharton could more accurately be listed as a new Barony, created in 1916, with the precedence of the older (and extinct) Barony.

The barony of 1544

The title Baron Wharton was created in 1544 by letters patent for Sir Thomas Wharton, who had previously served as a Member of Parliament for Cumberland, in recognition of his victory at the Battle of Solway Moss.  Because of its creation by letters patent, the Barony could only be passed down to male heirs.

The 5th Baron (1648–1715) had a long and distinguished political career, serving at various times as a Member of Parliament, Lord Lieutenant of Oxford and Buckingham, Lord Lieutenant of Ireland and Lord Privy Seal. He was created Earl of Wharton, in the County of Westmorland, and Viscount Winchendon, of Winchendon in the County of Buckingham, in 1706, in the Peerage of England, and in 1715 was further created Marquess of Wharton, in the County of Westmorland, and Marquess of Malmesbury, in the County of Wilts, in the Peerage of Great Britain. Later that year, he was also created Marquess of Catherlough, Earl of Rathfarnham, in the County of Dublin, and Baron Trim, in the County of Meath, in the Peerage of Ireland. (The Marquessate of Catherlough referred to the town now spelled Carlow.)

His son, the 2nd Marquess (1698–1731), was created Duke of Wharton, in the County of Westmorland, in the Peerage of Great Britain, in 1718, but all the titles were forfeit in 1729 when the Duke of Wharton was declared an outlaw. In any event, since on the Duke's death there were no male heirs of the 1st Baron remaining, all the titles would have become extinct at that point.

The Barony revived, or new Barony created

In 1844, however, the Barony was claimed by Colonel Charles Kemeys-Tynte, and, since the document creating the peerage had been lost, the Committee for Privileges of the House of Lords ruled erroneously that the Barony was created by writ and could therefore be passed down through the female line.  As a consequence of their resolution, it was determined that at the death of the Duke of Wharton, the Barony had fallen into abeyance between the Duke's sisters, Lady Jane Holt and Lady Lucy Morice. It was further determined that, at Lady Lucy's death in 1739, Lady Jane (by now Lady Jane Coke) remained the sole heir, and had been therefore entitled to the Barony. Finally, it was determined that at her death the Barony again fell into abeyance, where it remained in the nineteenth century.  The Committee for Privileges, however, also ruled that it did not have the authority to terminate the abeyance because of the existence of a judgement of outlawry against the Duke of Wharton.  Thus the matter remained unresolved for 72 years.

On 15 February 1916, the abeyance was terminated by a writ of summons from King George V to Parliament in favour of Charles Theodore Halswell Kemeys-Tynte, who became the 8th Baron. (He should be more properly listed as the 1st Baron Wharton, of the new barony.) At his death, the title was inherited successively by his son and thereafter by his daughter, Elisabeth, who became the 10th Baroness. At her death in 1974, the Barony again fell into abeyance, between her two daughters. It was once again revived in 1990, when the abeyance was terminated in favour of Myrtle Robertson. At her death, the Barony was inherited by her son Myles.

Barons Wharton (1544)
Sir Thomas Wharton, 1st Baron Wharton (c. 1495–1568)
Thomas Wharton, 2nd Baron Wharton (1520–1572)
Philip Wharton, 3rd Baron Wharton (1555–1625)
Philip Wharton, 4th Baron Wharton (1613–1696)
Thomas Wharton, 5th Baron Wharton (1648–1715) (created Earl of Wharton in 1706 and Marquess of Wharton in 1715)

Marquesses of Wharton (1715)
Thomas Wharton, 1st Marquess of Wharton (1648–1715)
Philip Wharton, 2nd Marquess of Wharton (1698–1731) (abeyant 1731) (created Duke of Wharton in 1718)

Dukes of Wharton (1718)
Philip Wharton, 1st Duke of Wharton (1698–1731) (forfeit 1729 (forfeiture retroactively reversed 1825), all except Barony extinct on his death, Barony abeyant on his death)

Barons Wharton (1544; continued)
Jane Wharton, 7th Baroness Wharton (1706–1761) (became sole heir 1739; abeyant on her death)
Charles Theodore Halswell Kemeys-Tynte, 8th Baron Wharton (1876–1934) (abeyance terminated 1916)
Charles John Halswell Kemeys-Tynte, 9th Baron Wharton (1908–1969)
Elisabeth Dorothy Kemeys-Tynte, 10th Baroness Wharton (1906–1974) (abeyant on her death)
Myrtle Olive Felix Robertson, 11th Baroness Wharton (1934–2000) (abeyance terminated 1990)
Myles Christopher David Robertson, 12th Baron Wharton (b. 1964)

The heir presumptive is the present holder's only child, the Hon. Meghan Ziky Mary Robertson (b. 2006).

Early Whartons
The Wharton baronetcy dates from 6 October 1292 when King Edward I granted to Gilbert de Querton "the Manor of Querton with its appurtenances." ("Querton" was the earlier Latin spelling of "Wharton")  There de Querton built Lammerside for himself and his wife, Emma de Hastings. (The remains of the building still stand and today resemble a pele tower). Emma was the daughter of Nicholas de Hastings of the family which were the ancestors of the present Earls of Huntingdon and of Pembroke.

The descendants of Sir Gilbert were:
Sir Henry de Querton (c.1281–aft.1343)
Sir Hugh de Querton (c.1308–bef.1389)
Sir William de Wherton (c.1327–bef.1417)
Sir John de Wharton (c.1360–1434)
Sir Thomas de Wherton (c.1388–c.1440)
Sir Henry Wharton (c.1437–?)
Sir Thomas Wharton II (1460 or 1465–1531)
Sir Thomas Wharton, 1st Baron Wharton (c. 1495–1568)

References
Genealogical Research in England – The Origin of the Hastings — G. Andrews Moriarty, A.M., LL.B., F.S.A
The Wharton Sleeve — Nathan Earl Wharton, 1949

Footnotes

External links
Wharton Hall
Lammerside

1544 establishments in England
Baronies in the Peerage of England
Baronies by writ
Baronies created by error
 
Noble titles created in 1544
Noble titles created in 1916